WAXL (103.3 FM) is a radio station  broadcasting a hot adult contemporary format. It is licensed to Santa Claus, Indiana, United States. The station is currently owned by Dubois County Broadcasting, Inc. and features programming from Westwood One.

History
The station went on the air as WAIX on 19 August 1994. On 1 June 1995, it changed its call sign to WAZU, and on 5 August 1996 to the current WAXL.

References

External links

AXL
Hot adult contemporary radio stations in the United States